Muhammed Aziz Khan (born 1955) is a Bangladeshi billionaire industrialist, founder and chairman of the Summit Group, one of the largest conglomerates in Bangladesh, whose power projects generate nearly 20% of Bangladesh's electricity. Khan has led Summit Group from starting as Bangladesh's first private sector power producer to a diversified group with investments across power, energy trading, port, telecommunications, hospitality and real estate. He is the 42nd richest person in Singapore.

Khan has led Summit in building partnerships with multinationals such as GE, IFC and Wärtsilä while securing billions of dollars in financing for infrastructure projects within Bangladesh. Khan pledged to invest another $3 billion into Bangladesh's energy sector.

Early life
Khan is the son of an army officer. His first steps as an businessman were taken with a friend, whose father's death thrust him into the family import business. The 18-year-old Khan borrowed Tk 30,000 from his father to partner in the venture in 1973.

He received an MBA in 1980 from the Institute of Business Administration, University of Dhaka (IBA). He studied in Armanitola Government High School and Notredame College, Dhaka.

He started with trading chemicals in Chawk Bazar and Urdu Road in Old Dhaka. Later he expanded his business with support from renowned businessmen such as Anwar Hossain of Anwar Group and Din Mohammad of Phoenix Group. Khan received his early loans from state-owned Pubali Bank and Rupali Bank. He discovered the importance of establishing goodwill that allowed easy financial mobilization.

Later he started trading plastic. In 1988, Khan purchased his first home in Singapore after becoming a permanent resident.

Career
Under his leadership, Summit Group set up the country's first independent power plant in 1998, Khulna Power Company Limited.

Summit set up the country's first private off-dock facility, Ocean Containers Limited, now known as Summit Alliance Port Limited which is currently handling about 30% of the country's export and about 10% of the country's import volume.

Summit Communications Ltd is the first company to lay nationwide telecommunication transmission network laying fibre optic to 70% of Bangladesh, and connecting Bangladesh to India and Myanmar through terrestrial fibre optics.

IPCO Ltd, a hospitality and real estate company, is building one five star and one three star hotels, a convention hall and 1000 shops beside the International Airport of Dhaka.

In 2011, Khan led Summit Group in establishing a joint venture with GE to build plants generating 327 megawatts of electricity for Bangladesh. This joint venture secured funding of $327 million, including $112 million from the World Bank.

In 2012, Khan led Summit Group in establishing a joint venture with China Energy Group, the largest government-owned Chinese company, to build various power projects, including a 341 megawatt power plant with a $220 million deal for China Energy Group to provide construction and engineering services.

In 2015, Khan was elected president of the Bangladesh Association of Publicly Listed Companies. He also led Summit Group in winning a deal to build Bangladesh's first high-tech business park, agreeing to invest $207 million to build part of the park across its 232-acre land in Kaliakor, Bangladesh.

In April 2016, Khan, his wife Anjuman Aziz Khan, daughter Ayesha Aziz Khan, brother Zafar Umayyad Khan and nephew Faisal Karim Khan were named in the Panama Papers as operating six offshore companies, mostly in the British Virgin Islands using a Singapore address. Summit Group states that it has no business in any form in Panama, nor it has any link with the legal firm Mossack Fonseca, and that there has not been any mention whatsoever of Khan in "The Panama Papers". The National Board of Revenue (NBR) has started an investigation into the money laundering and tax evasion histories of 25 Bangladeshi politicians and businessmen, including Khan; and the Anti Corruption Commission Bangladesh (ACC) has created a three-member committee to investigate. However, the Bangladesh-based British journalist David Bergman has clarified that the only Bangladeshi people linked to offshore companies as released by the ICIJ relate to an earlier 2013 leak of information involving the British Virgin Islands.

In May 2016, Khan was appointed Honorary Consul General of Finland in Bangladesh due to his long-standing business relationship with Finland. In particular, Aziz Khan has led Summit Group in building close trade relationships with leading Finnish company Wartsila, who has supplied machinery and equipment to many of the Summit Group's power project.

Also in 2016, Khan led Summit Group in securing $190 million in a consortium led by Standard Chartered to finance a $335 megawatt power plant. Khan also helped arranged the largest ever direct loan given to a Bangladeshi company in 2016 for $210 million by Asian Development Bank, International Finance Corporation and Islamic Development Bank. Khan has also indicated that Summit may list on the Singapore Stock Exchange, making it the first Bangladeshi company to do so.

In September 2016, Khan announced that Summit Group has established a Singaporean company that it will publicly list in Singapore and help raise $2.5 billion to invest in Bangladesh projects such as a liquified natural gas terminal and additional power capacity.

In January 2017, Summit Group announced that it would build a $500 million LNG terminal in Moheshkhali, Bangladesh. The project brings GE as an equity partner. Khan has said, "We want to ensure constant supply of primary energy for the country by implementing this project."
In August 2018, Mitsubishi Corporation acquired 25% of Summit LNG Terminal Co (Pvt) Ltd. In 2019, JERA acquired 22% stake of Summit Power International. Summit's Founder Chairman Muhammed Aziz Khan expressed his satisfaction with the investment stating, “Much needed technology and capital for Bangladesh’s fast growing power and energy market will be available from JERA with their vast knowledge and balance sheet. JERA by far could be our best partner. This partnership will support our investment program of USD 3 billion by 2022 in Bangladesh.”

In 2018, Forbes Asia listed Khan and family for the first time as the 34th richest in Singapore. In 2020, Forbes listed Muhammed Aziz Khan 37th richest in Singapore.

In 2021, Khan shares his plans with Bloomberg about Summit, JERA and Mitsubishi Corporation to jointly bid for an estimated USD 2.3 billion in FSRU projects in Payra (Bangladesh), Kerawalapitiya (Sri Lanka) and Pakistan as he sees demand for storage increasing as governments face volatility in natural gas prices.

Positions
 Chairman, Summit Group of companies, the largest infrastructure conglomerate in Bangladesh
 Chairman, Summit Power International, the largest Independent Power Producer (IPP) in Bangladesh
 Chairman, Summit Corporation Limited
 Chairman, Summit Power Limited (SPL), a publicly listed company in Bangladesh
 Chairman, Summit Holdings Limited
 Chairman, Summit Communications Limited
 Chairman, Cosmopolitan Communications Limited
 Chairman, Summit Technopolis Limited
 Chairman, Summit Oil and Shipping Company Limited (SOSCL)
 Former Chairman, IPCO Hotels and IPCO Developments Limited
 Chairman, Summit Alliance Port Limited (SAPL), a publicly listed company in Bangladesh
 Chairman, Siraj Khaleda Trust
 Trustee, Prothom Alo Trust
 President, Bangladesh Association of Publicly Listed Companies (BAPLC)
 Founding President, Bangladesh Energy Companies Association
 Honorary Consul General of Finland in Bangladesh
 Former Director, National Housing Finance and Investments Limited
 Chairman of Summit Asia Pacific Pte. Ltd.
 Founder President, Bangladesh Scouts Foundation.
 Founder Chairman (2009-2015), Prothom Alo  Trust.

Recognition
 2022 Priyadarshni Academy’s Global Award for Outstanding Contribution to Bangladesh’s Infrastructure
 2020 Asia’s Outstanding Leader at ACES Awards
 2018 Global Asian of the Year
 2015 Business Person of the Year, DHL & Daily Star Business Awards

Personal life 

Khan is a permanent resident of Singapore. He is married to Anjuman Aziz Khan. He met Anjuman as her tutor. They live in both Bangladesh and Singapore. Their residence in Dhaka, Serenity's Lodge, was designed by the architect Nahas Ahmed Khalil.

They have three daughters, Ayesha, Adeeba and Azeeza. Ayesha Khan is the managing director & CEO of Summit Power International. His second daughter Dr Adeeba Aziz Khan  is a fellow at Wolfson College, Cambridge University. His youngest daughter Azeeza Aziz Khan is one of the Directors of Summit Group of companies. He has four grandchildren.

He is the third of seven brothers. His eldest brother Lt Col (Rtd) Faruk Khan is a Member of Parliament (MP) and a former minister. His brothers Zafer Ummeed Khan, Latif Khan and Farid Khan are vice-chairmen of the Summit Group of Companies.

Among his close friends is Hamiduzzaman Khan, an artist and sculptor. Khan commissioned Bangladesh's first ever sculpture park and named it the Prof Hamiduzzaman Sculpture Park. Among the sculptures is the country's longest mural.

Anjuman and Aziz Charitable Trust (AACT) 
in 2022, Anjuman and Aziz Charitable Trust (AACT) of Bangladesh joined UNICEF's international council to help address the learning crisis caused by the Covid-19 pandemic, enabling 3,000 vulnerable children to re-enter education and catch up on lost learning many of whom were forced to drop out of school during the pandemic. The Anjuman and Aziz Charitable Trust made a four year partnership with the United Nations International Children's Emergency Fund (Unicef), now officially the United Nations Children's Fund.

The AACT has pledged to continue supporting Unicef Bangladesh in enabling the education of some of the most disadvantaged out-of-school children in the country, many of whom were forced to drop out of school during the Covid-19 pandemic.

AACT's support will enable Unicef's specialised learning programme to be offered to 3,000 children living in Dhaka South City Corporation Zones 3, 4, and 5 who have dropped out of school. These areas see some of the highest rates of out-of-school children in Bangladesh, with one of every three children deprived of education in some neighbourhoods.

Unicef will provide them with a unique approach to learn in a safe environment, until they either graduate from primary school or catch up until they and can be mainstreamed into regular schools. The programme will also benefit an estimated 5,000 parents and community leaders through community outreach activities.

The trustees of AACT, Anjuman Aziz Khan, Muhammed Aziz Khan, Hanns Kendel and Christian Prokopp joined the Unicef's International Council at its annual symposium in Copenhagen in October, 2022. They are the first members from Bangladesh to have joined the council.

References

1955 births
Bangladeshi businesspeople
Living people
University of Dhaka alumni
People named in the Panama Papers
Bangladeshi chairpersons of corporations
Notre Dame College, Dhaka alumni